Rock Stars is a documentary/reality television series that follows a team of rock scalers from a slope stabilization/rock remediation company. The series is produced by Echo Entertainment for the National Geographic Channel. Ten episodes have been created so far, the first airing on November 22, 2011.

Plot
The series portrays a group of rock remediation technicians whose primary objective is to protect the public and their communities from rockslides. As trained professionals, these men suspend on the sides of cliffs that are anywhere from 25 to 200-feet high and remove any unstable rocks or boulders that could pose a potential threat to unsuspecting drivers and hikers below. The crew use scale bars, a crow-bar type of tool with an angled tip, to bring down most of the rock. Often they also utilize rubber airbags inflated by an air compressor to bring down the larger masses of rock. The company also specializes in rock bolting, wire mesh installation, rock net installation, shotcrete, slope monitoring and slope blasting. The company has been around since 1968 and has long been a leader in the rock remediation world.

Location
The first season takes place in two locations, White Pass (Washington) along U.S. Route 12 and Niagara Falls.

Production
The documentary was filmed and produced by Echo Entertainment, a production company out of Studio City, California. Each member of the production crew was required to attend a week-long training course to obtain a certification in ropes access. Cameramen shooting on Sony EX-1s and Sony XDCam-800s were often suspended over the sides of the cliffs while shooting the scalers on the mountain. GoPro helmet cameras were also mounted on the helmets of each rock scaler to capture POV of the scalers on the hill.

Episodes
 "Chaos On The Cascades" – 11/22/2011
 "Deathtrap" – 11/29/2011
 "Meltdown on the Mountain" – 12/6/2011
 "Man v. Boulder" – 12/13/2011
 "Falling Apart" – 12/20/2011
 "Assault On Niagara" – 12/27/2011
 "House of Cards" – 1/3/2012
 "D-Day" – 1/10/2012
 "Bolt to the Finish" – 1/17/2012
 "Blowing Up" – 1/24/2012

References

 Rock Stars Episode Guide. National Geographic Channel.

External links

Watch Rock Stars

2010s American reality television series
National Geographic (American TV channel) original programming
2011 American television series debuts
2012 American television series endings